Kamil Dankowski (born 22 July 1996) is a Polish professional footballer who plays as a right-back for ŁKS Łódź.

Club career
On 1 September 2020, he joined ŁKS Łódź.

Career statistics

Club

References

External links
 

1996 births
People from Duszniki-Zdrój
Sportspeople from Lower Silesian Voivodeship
Living people
Polish footballers
Poland youth international footballers
Poland under-21 international footballers
Association football midfielders
Śląsk Wrocław players
ŁKS Łódź players
Ekstraklasa players
I liga players
III liga players